Pashto is a town, and one of twenty union councils in Battagram District of Khyber-Pakhtunkhwa, Pakistan.

References

Union councils of Battagram District
Populated places in Battagram District